Annularisca is a genus of land snails with an operculum, terrestrial gastropod mollusks in the family Pomatiidae.

Species 
Species within the genus Annularisca include:
Annularisca aberrans Torre & Bartsch, 1941
Annularisca alata (Pfeiffer, 1851)
Annularisca alayoi (Jaume, 1984)
Annularisca armasi (Jaume, 1984)
Annularisca arquesi Torre & Bartsch, 1941
Annularisca auricoma (Gundlach in Pfeiffer, 1859)
Annularisca borroi (Jaume, 1984)
Annularisca cumulata (Pfeiffer, 1863)
Annularisca eburnea (Gundlach in Pfeiffer, 1858)
Annularisca fragilis (Gundlach in Pfeiffer, 1859)
Annularisca hendersoni Torre & Bartsch, 1941
Annularisca heynemanni (Pfeiffer, 1864)
Annularisca holguinensis Torre & Bartsch, 1941
Annularisca incerta Torre & Bartsch, 1941
Annularisca intercisa Torre & Bartsch, 1941
Annularisca interstitialis (Gundlach in Pfeiffer, 1859)
Annularisca mackinlayi (Gundlach in Pfeiffer, 1859)
Annularisca mayariensis Torre & Bartsch, 1941
Annularisca mayensis Torre & Bartsch, 1941
Annularisca pallens Torre & Bartsch, 1941
Annularisca prestoni (Ramsden, 1914)
Annularisca pseudalata (Torre in Pilsbry & Henderson, 1912)
Annularisca ramsdeni (Pilsbry & Henderson, 1912)
Annularisca romeri (Pfeiffer, 1864)
Annularisca tacrensis Torre & Bartsch, 1941
Annularisca toroensis Torre & Bartsch, 1941
Annularisca torrebartschi (Jaume, 1984)
Annularisca victoris Torre & Bartsch, 1941
Annularisca wrighti Torre & Bartsch, 1941
Annularisca yaterasensis (Pfeiffer, 1865)
Annularisca yumuriensis Torre & Bartsch, 1941
Annularisca yunquensis (Pfeiffer, 1860)

References 

Pomatiidae